Identity Crisis was a Philippine new wave band. Known for its songs "Imagining Oktober" and "My Sanctuary", it was one of the bands that helped dominate the Philippine New Wave scene, along with The Dawn.

History
Identity Crisis was formed in 1986, consisting of Lenny Llapitan (keyboards), Resty (guitars), Buddy Boy (vocals), Bogs (bass), Marvin (drums) and Carla Abaya (vocals), also known as Cool Carla of the now-defunct WXB 102. The band brought in elements of gothic rock, Middle Eastern, classical and jazz, backed with Abaya's gothic vocals, to make a distinct new wave sound. Following a pre-release single, "Whispering Castles," in late 1987, they released their debut album Tale Of Two, on April 4th, 1988. Its singles "Imagining Oktober" and "My Sanctuary" received regular airplay. In 1990, the band recorded their last album Water Came Running, but broke up later the same year. By 1992, Abaya and Llapitan formed Mariya's Mistress, which lasted until 1997. In 2011, Identity Crisis reunited for a one-off concert, with bassist Tabs Tabuñar stepping in on behalf of Arleigh Ambrosio, who passed away earlier that year.

Discography

Albums
1988 - Tale Of Two
1990 - Water Came Running

A Tale of Two(1987)
 Imagining October
 Whispering Castles
 Blank Pages
 Sumigaw, Umawit Ka
 My Sanctuary
 When the Sun Will Shine
 Requiem
 Anthem

Water Came Running(1990)
 Where the Wild Things Grow
 Golden Age
 Image Of The Orient
 Hidden Face
 Water Came Running
 Behind The Line
 In This World
 Will I Ever Know
 Pangarap
 With One Mind

References

Filipino rock music groups
Musical groups established in 1986
Musical groups from Metro Manila
1986 establishments in the Philippines